Marion Freisler (née Russegger; 10 February 1910 in Hamburg – 21 January 1997 in Munich) was the wife of Roland Freisler, the infamous judge and chairman of the Nazi Volksgerichtshof (People's Court), who died in 1945 during an air raid in Berlin. She is sometimes mistakenly referred to as Anna Freisler.

Marion Russegger was born 10 February 1910 in Hamburg, the daughter of Bernhard Adolf Cajetan Russegger, a merchant in Hamburg and Bremen, and Cornelia Pirscher. On 24 March 1928, she married Roland Freisler, who was a lawyer and city councillor of the Nazi Party in Kassel at the time. They had two sons, Harald and Roland, and both were baptized. On 3 February 1945, her husband was killed during an Allied air raid in Berlin. In his will, dated 1 October 1944, Freisler had decreed that their two houses belonged to his wife. She was considered "not incriminated" by the decision of the tribunal of April 29, 1953 and was his universal heir. She never remarried and, after the war, resumed her birth name Russegger and moved to Munich.

In 1974, her pension was raised by about 400 Deutsche Marks. The explanation given by the pension office was that had her husband survived the war, and not been executed, disbarred, or imprisoned by the military tribunals of the allied countries, he presumably would have had a successful career as a lawyer or a senior judge. This decision was protested by a member of the Bavarian Landtag, but the protest was rejected by the state government. This was one of the last incidents connected with the problematic issue of social integration of National Socialist jurists in the Federal Republic of Germany in the early years. In 1985, there was a scandal about her and other well-pensioned survivors of high-ranking Nazi officials. In 1997, aged 86, Freisler died. She was buried in Berlin in the Russegger family plot alongside her parents and her husband (Roland Freisler's name is not on his gravestone).

Bibliography
 Guido Knopp, Hitler's Hitmen, Sutton Publishing (2002), chapter "The Hanging Judge", pp. 213–251.

References

1997 deaths
1910 births
People from Hamburg
People of Nazi Germany
Roland Freisler